Bojdan may refer to:
 Bojdan, Rud Ab
 Bojdan, Sheshtomad